Petrozavodsky (masculine), Petrozavodskaya (feminine), or Petrozavodskoye (neuter) may refer to:
Petrozavodsky Uyezd (1776–1927), an administrative division of the Russian Empire and the early Russian SFSR
Petrozavodsky Urban Okrug, a municipal formation which the city of republic significance of Petrozavodsk in the Republic of Karelia, Russia is incorporated as